Caleb Joel Richards (born 8 September 1998) is an English footballer who plays as a defender for Kidderminster Harriers.

Club career

Blackpool
After being club youth team captain he signed professional terms in May 2017.

He made his first-team debut for Blackpool in the EFL Cup in a second round match against Wigan Athletic. After his appearance in an EFL Trophy match against Middlesbrough's Under 21 team where Blackpool won 4–1, he was shortlisted for the competition's player of the round.
 
He was released by the club at the end of the 2017–18 season.

Loans
Whilst at Blackpool he had four loan spells at other clubs. He joined Marine on loan in November 2016. At the beginning of the 2017–18 season he joined Warrington Town on loan with the loan being extended in October.

He then spent time on loan at Southport, joining them in December 2017. In March 2018 he joined Leek Town with the spell being extended until the end of the season.

Norwich City
After being released by Blackpool he joined Norwich City as a member of the club's Under 23 development team in the summer of 2018. He started ten matches for the development team before going out on loan at the end of November.

Loans
On 30 November he joined FC United of Manchester on loan. He made his debut for the club on 1 December in match against York City.

On 4 February 2019, Richards joined the Tampa Bay Rowdies on loan.

On 31 January 2020, Richards joined National League side Yeovil Town on loan until the end of the 2019–20 season.

He joined Kidderminster Harriers on loan in September 2020.

Kidderminster Harriers
On 18 March 2021, Richards completed a permanent move to Kidderminster Harriers following the end of his loan spell with the club.

Career statistics

References

External links
 

1998 births
Living people
Blackpool F.C. players
Southport F.C. players
Marine F.C. players
Warrington Town F.C. players
Leek Town F.C. players
Norwich City F.C. players
F.C. United of Manchester players
Tampa Bay Rowdies players
Yeovil Town F.C. players
Kidderminster Harriers F.C. players
Association football defenders
Footballers from Salford
Northern Premier League players
National League (English football) players
Expatriate soccer players in the United States
English expatriate sportspeople in the United States
English footballers
English expatriate footballers
USL Championship players